El Fin del Mundo (Spanish: 'End of the World') is an ancient Pleistocene site near Pitiquito in northwestern Sonora, Mexico. It features Clovis culture period occupation dating around 13,390 calibrated years BP and was discovered during a 2007 survey.

El Fin del Mundo is one of the oldest Clovis sites in North America, roughly similar chronologically to the Aubrey site in Denton County, Texas, which produced a radiocarbon date that is almost identical.

Clovis hunters
In 2011, remains of Gomphothere dating around 13,390 calibrated years BP were found. This was the first such association found in a northern part of the continent where gomphotheres had been thought to have gone extinct 30,000 years ago. In July 2014, it was announced that the "position and proximity of Clovis weapon fragments relative to the gomphothere bones at the site suggest that humans did in fact kill the two animals there. Of the seven Clovis points found at the site, four were in place among the bones, including one with bone and teeth fragments above and below. The other three points had clearly eroded away from the bone bed and were found scattered nearby."

Bones of horse and bison, as well as horse teeth, were also found at the site.

See also
Paleo-Indians

Notes

Bibliography
Ferring, C. Reid (2001) The Archaeology and Paleoecology of the Aubrey Clovis Site (41DN479) Denton County, Texas. (Center for Environmental Archaeology, Dept. of Geography, Univ. of North Texas, Denton
Sanchez, Guadalupe, Vance T. Holliday, Edmund P. Gaines, Joaquín Arroyo-Cabrales, Natalia Martínez-Tagüeña, Andrew Kowler, Todd Lange, Gregory W. L. Hodgins, Susan M. Mentzer, and Ismael Sanchez- Morales. Human (Clovis)gomphothere (Cuvieronius sp.) association ~13,390 calibrated yr BP in Sonora, Mexico. Proceedings of the National Academy of Sciences, 111: 10972-10977

External links
Vance T. Holliday, Guadalupe Sanchez, El Fin del Mundo, Sonora, Mexico  argonaut.arizona.edu

Clovis sites
Archaeological sites in Sonora
Gomphotheres